Nahr al-Kabir al-Shamali (Ugaritic: 𐎗𐎈𐎁𐎐, rḥbn) is a river in Latakia Governorate, Syria.

History
During Ugarit period, the river was known as "Raḥbānu".

Course
Al-Kabir al-Shamali river rises in the Syrian Coastal Mountain Range, north western Syria at the Turkish borders, and runs through a plain area to the south west to finally flow into the Mediterranean Sea south of Latakia.

Dams
16 Tishreen dam, built to be used in power generation, storage of rain and river water, and the creation of Mashqita lake for fishing and tourism.
Baradun Dam, is another dam under construction on the river to the north of the previous one. However, the construction was halted during the Syrian Civil War.

References

Rivers of Syria

Ugarit